Rigidoporus nevadensis is a species of polypore fungus in the family Meripilaceae. Found in the Andes region of Venezuela, it was described as a new species in 2010 by mycologists Teresa Iturriaga and Leif Ryvarden.

References

Fungi described in 2010
Fungi of Venezuela
Meripilaceae
Taxa named by Leif Ryvarden